Elections to Magherafelt District Council were held on 19 May 1993 on the same day as the other Northern Irish local government elections. The election used three district electoral areas to elect a total of 16 councillors.

Election results

Note: "Votes" are the first preference votes.

Districts summary

|- class="unsortable" align="centre"
!rowspan=2 align="left"|Ward
! % 
!Cllrs
! % 
!Cllrs
! %
!Cllrs
! %
!Cllrs
! % 
!Cllrs
!rowspan=2|TotalCllrs
|- class="unsortable" align="center"
!colspan=2 bgcolor="" | SDLP
!colspan=2 bgcolor="" | Sinn Féin
!colspan=2 bgcolor="" | DUP
!colspan=2 bgcolor="" | UUP
!colspan=2 bgcolor="white"| Others
|-
|align="left"|Magherafelt Town
|31.8
|2
|16.5
|1
|bgcolor="#D46A4C"|33.5
|bgcolor="#D46A4C"|2
|18.2
|1
|0.0
|0
|6
|-
|align="left"|Moyola
|bgcolor="#99FF66"|26.8
|bgcolor="#99FF66"|1
|21.5
|1
|23.4
|2
|25.9
|1
|2.4
|0
|5
|-
|align="left"|Sperrin
|bgcolor="#99FF66"|39.8
|bgcolor="#99FF66"|2
|33.1
|2
|6.2
|0
|17.3
|1
|3.6
|0
|5
|- class="unsortable" class="sortbottom" style="background:#C9C9C9"
|align="left"| Total
|32.9
|5
|23.5
|4
|21.4
|4
|20.3
|3
|1.9
|0
|16
|-
|}

District results

Magherafelt Town

1989: 2 x DUP, 1 x SDLP, 1 x UUP, 1 x Sinn Féin
1993: 2 x DUP, 2 x SDLP, 1 x UUP, 1 x Sinn Féin
1989-1993 Change: SDLP gain due to the addition of one seat

Moyola

1989: 2 x UUP, 1 x Sinn Féin, 1 x DUP, 1 x SDLP
1993: 2 x DUP, 1 x Sinn Féin, 1 x UUP, 1 x SDLP
1989-1993 Change: Sinn Féin gain from DUP

Sperrin

1989: 2 x SDLP, 1 x Sinn Féin, 1 x UUP, 1 x Independent Nationalist
1993: 2 x SDLP, 2 x Sinn Féin, 1 x UUP
1989-1993 Change: No change

References

Magherafelt District Council elections
Magherafelt